A melon is any of various plants of the family Cucurbitaceae, and their sweet, edible, fleshy fruit.

Melon may also refer to:

Music
 Melon (band)
 The Melons, an English band
 Melon, a 1971 album by Sweetwater
 Melon: Remixes for Propaganda, a 1995 compilation album by U2
 Melon (online music service), a South Korean music streaming site and online retailer
 Melon Music Awards

People
Jean-François Melon (1675–1738), French political economist
 Anthony Fantano, nicknamed Melon, an American music critic

Other uses
 Melón, a place in Ourense, Spain
 Melon (apple), a dessert apple
 Melon (cetacean), a mass of adipose tissue in the forehead of toothed whales
 Melon (chemistry), a polymeric derivative of heptazine
 Melon de Bourgogne, or Melon, a white grape variety
 Melon Bicycles, a folding bicycle manufacturer
 "Melon", a spoken word piece from Ten in the Swear Jar's Accordion Solo!, 2005

See also 

 Mellen (disambiguation)
 Mellin (disambiguation)
 Mellon (disambiguation)
 Melones (disambiguation)
 Tree melon (disambiguation)